Leonhard Euler proved the Euler product formula for the Riemann zeta function in his thesis Variae observationes circa series infinitas (Various Observations about Infinite Series), published by St Petersburg Academy in 1737.

The Euler product formula

The Euler product formula for the Riemann zeta function reads

where the left hand side equals the Riemann zeta function:

and the product on the right hand side extends over all prime numbers p:

Proof of the Euler product formula 

This sketch of a proof makes use of simple algebra only. This was the method by which Euler originally discovered the formula. There is a certain sieving property that we can use to our advantage:

Subtracting the second equation from the first we remove all elements that have a factor of 2:

Repeating for the next term:

Subtracting again we get:

where all elements having a factor of 3 or 2 (or both) are removed.

It can be seen that the right side is being sieved. Repeating infinitely for  where  is prime,  we get:

Dividing both sides by everything but the ζ(s) we obtain:

This can be written more concisely as an infinite product over all primes p:

The case s = 1

An interesting result can be found for ζ(1), the harmonic series:

which can also be written as,

which is, 

as,

thus,

While the series ratio test is inconclusive for the left-hand side it may be shown divergent by bounding logarithms. Similarly for the right-hand side the infinite coproduct of reals greater than one does not guarantee divergence, e.g., 
.
Instead, the denominator may be written in terms of the primorial numerator so that divergence is clear

given the trivial composed logarithmic divergence of an inverse prime series.

Another proof 

Each factor (for a given prime p) in the product above can be expanded to a geometric series consisting of the reciprocal of p raised to multiples of s, as follows

When , this series converges absolutely. Hence we may take a finite number of factors, multiply them together, and rearrange terms. Taking all the primes p up to some prime number limit q, we have

where σ is the real part of s. By the fundamental theorem of arithmetic, the partial product when expanded out gives a sum consisting of those terms n−s where n is a product of primes less than or equal to q. The inequality results from the fact that therefore only integers larger than q can fail to appear in this expanded out partial product. Since the difference between the partial product and ζ(s) goes to zero when σ > 1, we have convergence in this region.

See also
 Euler product
 Riemann zeta function

References
 John Derbyshire, Prime Obsession: Bernhard Riemann and The Greatest Unsolved Problem in Mathematics, Joseph Henry Press, 2003,

Notes

Zeta and L-functions
Article proofs
Leonhard Euler
Infinite products